The Transactions of the Institute of British Geographers  is a peer-reviewed academic journal published by Wiley-Blackwell on behalf of the Royal Geographical Society.

According to the Journal Citation Reports, the journal has a 2019 impact factor of 4.32, ranking it 8th out of 84 journals in the category "Geography".

References

External links 
 

Geography journals
Royal Geographical Society
Wiley-Blackwell academic journals
Quarterly journals
English-language journals
Publications established in 1935
Academic journals associated with learned and professional societies of the United Kingdom